Sergei Alekseyevich Kaputin (born 22 August 1983) is a former Russian professional footballer.

Club career
Kaputin played in the Kazakhstan Premier League with FC Tobol and FC Kairat.

Honours
 Kazakhstan Premier League runner-up: 2003.

External links

1983 births
Living people
Russian footballers
Association football defenders
FC Neftekhimik Nizhnekamsk players
FC Kairat players
FC Tobol players
Kazakhstan Premier League players
Russian expatriate footballers
Expatriate footballers in Kazakhstan
Russian expatriate sportspeople in Kazakhstan